La Pandilla en Apuros ("La Pandilla is in Trouble") is a 1976 musical teen-comedy film featuring the well known teenage musical group from Spain, La Pandilla.

The film, which was produced by Alfred D. Herger, was recorded at the Condado Beach Hotel (where the group stayed at for the duration of the filming) and at other locations in San Juan, Puerto Rico, including the Isla Verde International Airport.

Apart from featuring the members of La Pandilla, the film marked the movie debut of Puerto Rican comedian Adrian Garcia and of fellow Puerto Rican, singer Felito Félix.

Plot
La Pandilla is in Puerto Rico for a series of concerts. While there, they get involved in a situation involving a stolen audio recorder. The group also performs at a concert which was held at Roberto Clemente Coliseum in San Juan.

Soundtrack
The movie had a soundtrack album which was also released in 1976. The album contained the following songs:

 La Pandilla en apuros	
 Diálogos de La Pandilla	
 Bakala Nanu Meme Suite	
 Comprando sombreros	
 La dama vaquera	
 La piscina	
 1-2-3	
 Quiero ser tu amigo	
 Los recien casaditos	
 Quiero volar	
 Primo Pachanga

See also
 Conexión Caribe - a movie featuring Los Chicos de Puerto Rico
 Menudo: La Pelicula - a movie featuring Menudo
 Una Aventura Llamada Menudo - a movie featuring Menudo
 Secuestro En Acapulco-Canta Chamo - a movie featuring Los Chamos

References

1976 films
Puerto Rican comedy films
Films set in Puerto Rico
1970s Spanish-language films
Comedy film soundtracks
Spanish-language soundtracks